Vannessa Vasquez is an American actress who was born on December 21, 1983 in Galveston , Texas, USA. She is an actress and producer, known for East Los High (2013), The Brave (2017) and The Fix (2019). She began her acting career performing in local theatres in Houston, Texas, later gaining her first role in television working with singer-songwriter Frankie J on the reggaeton mix of his Billboard Hot 100 hit "Obsessions (No Es Amor)". Later becoming the lead actress in the independent horror and thriller film "Sorrow", as well as an associate producer.

Early life and education
 
Vasquez's family is from Monterrey, Mexico, but she grew in the small town of Richmond, Texas.  Vasquez was raised by her single mother and grandmother until the age of 10. Since money was scarce for any extra curricular activities she began acting at the age of 6, performing skits for her family while living at grandmother's house. When her mother got married she moved to Sugar Land, Texas. Having  to deal with the adversities of growing up in a new town, an integrated home and new stepfather she took part in whatever activities grade school offered. In sixth grade, she read for the role of Becky in the play The Adventures of Tom Sawyer. From there she took dance in middle school and high school along with theatre. She was raised by her mother and stepfather until the age of 18. At the age of 18 she set off to Mexico to find her biological father. Since then she has worked to maintain a relationship with her father in Mexico. Through love and forgiveness she has built a strong relationship with both her stepfather and biological father.

Being the first in her family to attend college she knew the importance of having an education. Even though her dreams were in Hollywood, Vasquez went on to study theater and psychology at the University of Houston, graduating with a B.A. in social sciences and liberal arts. After college and unhealthy romantic relationships she set out after her dreams to be an actress  and ran away to Hollywood. Not knowing how she was going to pay for acting classes or where she was going to live she set out west in faith. She found shelter couch surfing with acquaintances until she got a job at Mel's diner in Hollywood as a waitress across the street from her dream acting school Stella Adler Academy. She then received a scholarship to the Stella Adler Academy in Los Angeles.

Career
Vasquez began her career by performing in local stage theatres in Houston. One of her first Television gigs was  working with singer-songwriter Frankie J on the reggaeton mix of his Billboard Hot 100 hit "Obsessions (No Es Amor)". She was the lead actress in the independent horror and thriller film "Sorrow", as well as an associate producer. She starred as Magdalena Cruz in "Sins of a Call Girl" and as Esperanza in "Narca", directed by R. Ellis Frazier.  She co-starred as Gracie in the action film "Misfire", alongside Gary Daniels.

In 2014, Vasquez became one of the lead actresses in Hulu’s East Los High series, the first English-language Hulu series with an all-Latino cast. She plays Camila Barrios, a Mexican teenager dealing with the trials and tribulations of growing up in East Los Angeles.

In 2018 she was cast as one of the lead actors in the ABC pilot The Mission.

Personal life
Vasquez is a member of Sigma Lambda Gamma sorority. She is a dancer, with training in bachata, salsa, cumbia, merengue and hip-hop. She is also fluent in Spanish. In the fall of 2014, Alegria Magazine named her one of its "Top 10 Latinas making waves in Hollywood". In 2016 she was named one the top 8 leading ladies for TV y Novelas Magazine.

Filmography

Films

Television

References

External links
 

1983 births
Living people
21st-century American actresses
American film actresses
American television actresses
American actresses of Mexican descent
University of Houston alumni
Hispanic and Latino American actresses
Actresses from Texas
People from Galveston, Texas